Symmetrischema lectulifera is a moth in the family Gelechiidae. It was described by Edward Meyrick in 1929. It is found in North America, where it has been recorded Texas.

The wingspan is 13–16 mm. The forewings are whitish ochreous partially tinged or suffused with light grayish ocherous and with the costal edge tinged with blackish at the base. There is an elongate blackish costal patch from one-fifth to three-fourths, not reaching quite halfway across the wing, the anterior edge oblique, its lower edge with black marks before and beyond the middle, edged beneath with small grayish-ocherous spots representing the discal stigmata, the posterior edge somewhat shorter and direct. The plical stigma is indistinct, grayish ocherous, and rather before the first discal and there is an indistinct whitish slightly bent transverse line at three-fourths, with beyond this a slender black streak running to the apex, interrupted before the apex. The hindwings are gray, in the disc lighter and bluish tinged, on the costal area and terminal edge darker gray.

References

Symmetrischema
Moths described in 1929